Friedrich Wilhelm Engelhard (19 Sept 1813 - 22 January 1902) was a German sculptor and painter.

Biography
He was born in Grünhagen (near Bienenbüttel, Prussia). He studied at Hanover, at Copenhagen with Thorwaldsen and at Munich with Schwanthaler.

Works
He executed many groups, single figures and genre pieces. His chief work was a frieze on the Edda. This was executed in 1857 in the Marienburg Palace at the request of George V, King of Hanover. It is a colossal work dealing with the main features of the saga and rich in grand sculptural effects.

Among Engelhard's other creations are “Love on a Swan,” “Dancing Springtime,” “Slinger with Dog,” “Bacchus Conquering a Panther,” “Cupid and Psyche,” “A Child Fishing,” “A Child Threading a Needle,” statue of St. Michael, portrait medallion of Bismarck (for the monument of Canossa, near Harzberg), “Christ Blessing Little Children,” and legendary characters of Germany: Odin, Thor, and the Valkyries.

Notes

References
 

1813 births
1902 deaths
German sculptors
German male sculptors
19th-century German painters
19th-century German male artists
German male painters